The Leffingwell Inn (now known as Leffingwell House Museum) is a historic inn at 348 Washington Street in the Norwichtown section of Norwich, Connecticut.  With a construction history dating to 1675, it is one of Connecticut's oldest buildings, and was an important meeting place during the American Revolutionary War.  The building was listed on the National Register of Historic Places in 1970.

Description and history
The Leffingwell Inn is located just south of the junction of Town and Washington Streets, at the southern end of the Norwichtown area.  It is a -story wood-frame structure, built in stages in the 17th and 18th centuries.  Its oldest part, the northeastern corner, dates to 1675 and was built by Stephen Backus.  The Inn was founded by Thomas Leffingwell 2nd, the son of Norwich co-founder Thomas Leffingwell. Over the next century it was altered and expanded several times, reaching its present configuration, which is a roughly square structure with two main facades and long sloping roof lines along the other two facades, as if two saltbox houses had been joined at a corner.  It has many features dating primarily to the 18th century, including casement windows, wooden paneling, and several kitchen hearths, a further indication of the building's evolutionary construction history.

Most of the architectural features of the house are the handiwork of Benajah and Christopher Leffingwell, who made the most significant alterations and additions in the 18th century.  Christopher, in addition to operating the inn, established Norwich's first paper mill, as well as a stocking factory.  The inn is locally historically important as a meeting point during the American Revolutionary War.  It is now a museum property owned by a local historical society.

See also

National Register of Historic Places listings in New London County, Connecticut
List of Washington's Headquarters during the Revolutionary War
List of the oldest buildings in Connecticut

References

External links
Leffingwell House Museum

Hotel buildings completed in the 17th century
Commercial buildings on the National Register of Historic Places in Connecticut
Historic American Buildings Survey in Connecticut
Historic house museums in Connecticut
Museums in New London County, Connecticut
Saltbox architecture in Connecticut
Buildings and structures in Norwich, Connecticut
National Register of Historic Places in New London County, Connecticut
Historic district contributing properties in Connecticut
1675 establishments in Connecticut
Buildings and structures completed in 1675